During the 2014–15 season Jong Ajax will participate in the Dutch Eerste Divisie, the 2nd tier of professional football in the Netherlands.

Pre-season
The first training for the 2014–15 season was held on 17 June 2014. In preparation for the new season Ajax organized a training stage at Sportpark De Toekomst, Amsterdam, Netherlands. The squad from manager Jaap Stam and Andries Ulderink stayed there from 17 June 2014 to 1 July 2014. During this training stage friendly matches were played against HVV Hollandia, Wilhelmina '08, FC Den Helder, Jong PEC Zwolle, Al Shabab Al Arabi Club and Sivasspor.

Player statistics 
Appearances for competitive matches only

|-
|colspan="14"|First team players who have made appearances for reserve squad:

|-
|colspan="14"|Youth players who have made appearances for reserve squad:

|-
|colspan="14"|Players sold or loaned out after the start of the season:

|-
|}
As of 2 March 2015

Eerste Divisie standings 2013–14

Points by match day

Total points by match day

Standing by match day

Goals by match day

2012–13 Team records

Topscorers

Competitions
All times are in CEST

Eerste Divisie

Friendlies

References

Jong Ajax seasons